Vellyani Agricultural College Ground is a multi purpose stadium in Vellyani, Thiruvananthapuram, Kerala. The ground is mainly used for organizing matches of football, cricket and other sports.

The stadium has hosted four Ranji Trophy matches  from 1990 when Kerala cricket team played against Goa cricket team until 1999.

The stadium has hosted four Ranji Trophy matches  from 1990 when Kerala cricket team played against Hyderabad cricket team until 1999 but since then the stadium has hosted non-first-class matches.

The ground has also host an under-19s Test match between India national under-19 cricket team and Australia national under-19 cricket team in March 1994 in future international cricketer like VVS Laxman, Hrishikesh Kanitkar, Pankaj Dhirmani, Pankaj Dharmani, Sridharan Sriram from India and Michael Hussey, Andrew Symonds and Brett Lee from Australia played against each other.

References

External links 

 Cricketarchive
 Cricinfo

Cricket grounds in Kerala
Sports venues in Thiruvananthapuram
University sports venues in India
Defunct cricket grounds in India
1963 establishments in Kerala
Sports venues completed in 1963
20th-century architecture in India